The 2014 Aaron's 312 was the ninth car race of the 2014 NASCAR Nationwide Series season, and the 23rd iteration of the event. The race was held on Saturday, May 3, 2014, Lincoln, Alabama, at Talladega Superspeedway, a 2.66-mile (4.28 km) permanent triangle-shaped superspeedway. The race took the scheduled 117 laps to complete. On the final restart with three to go, Joe Gibbs Racing driver Elliott Sadler would manage to hold off the field to take home his 10th career NASCAR Nationwide Series series victory and his only victory of the season. To fill out the podium, Roush Fenway Racing driver Chris Buescher and JR Motorsports driver Regan Smith would finish second and third, respectively.

Background 

Talladega Superspeedway, originally known as Alabama International Motor Superspeedway (AIMS), is a motorsports complex located north of Talladega, Alabama. It is located on the former Anniston Air Force Base in the small city of Lincoln. The track is a tri-oval and was constructed in the 1960s by the International Speedway Corporation, a business controlled by the France family. Talladega is most known for its steep banking and the unique location of the start/finish line that's located just past the exit to pit road. The track currently hosts the NASCAR series such as the NASCAR Cup Series, Xfinity Series and the Camping World Truck Series. Talladega is the longest NASCAR oval with a length of 2.66-mile-long (4.28 km) tri-oval like the Daytona International Speedway, which also is a 2.5-mile-long (4 km) tri-oval.

Entry list 

 (R) denotes rookie driver.
 (i) denotes driver who is ineligible for series driver points.

Practice

First practice 
The first practice session was held on Thursday, May 1, at 2:00 PM CST. The session would last for one hour.

Final practice 
The final practice session, sometimes referred to as Happy Hour, was held on Thursday, May 1, at 3:30 PM CST. The session would last for one hour and 30 minutes.

Qualifying 
Qualifying was held on Friday, May 2, at 5:40 PM CST. Since Talladega Superspeedway is at least  in length, the qualifying system was a multi-car system that included three rounds. The first round was 25 minutes, where every driver would be able to set a lap within the 25 minutes. Then, the second round would consist of the fastest 24 cars in Round 1, and drivers would have 10 minutes to set a lap. Round 3 consisted of the fastest 12 drivers from Round 2, and the drivers would have 5 minutes to set a time. Whoever was fastest in Round 3 would win the pole.

Two drivers would fail to qualify: Chad Boat and Derrike Cope.

Full qualifying results 

*Time not available.

Race results

Standings after the race 

Drivers' Championship standings

Note: Only the first 10 positions are included for the driver standings.

References 

2014 NASCAR Nationwide Series
May 2014 sports events in the United States
2014 in sports in Alabama
NASCAR races at Talladega Superspeedway